The Nikon Coolpix L11 is a compact automatic digital camera made by Nikon. It has a 6.0 megapixel maximum resolution, which can be adjusted, and an ISO up to 800 (cannot be adjusted). It features a QuickTime movie mode, many beginner scene modes, and a sound recorder. The camera uses 2 AA batteries for power.

The Best Shot Selector feature on this camera allows users to hold down the shutter button, and the camera will take ten pictures. Then, the camera will decide which one is the clearest and will save that one only. This is designed for use when taking a picture without flash in a dark setting.

Other specifications
Zoom: 3x optical, 4x digital
Storage: 7 MB internal memory and SD memory cards
File formats: JPEG for photos, MOV for video, WAV for sound recording
Weight: 125g/4.4oz without battery and memory card
Image resolution: 6 MP 2816x2112 (default), 3 MP 2048x1536, 1024x768, 640x480

See also
 Nikon Coolpix series
 Nikon

External links
 Camera Specs
 Nikon L10/L11 Official Specs

L011